Death Defying Acts is a 2007 supernatural romance film, directed by Gillian Armstrong, and starring Guy Pearce and Catherine Zeta-Jones. It concerns an episode in the life of Hungarian-American escapologist Harry Houdini at the height of his career in the 1920s. It was screened in a special presentation at the 2007 Toronto International Film Festival.

Plot 
In 1926, 13 years after his mother's death, illusionist Harry Houdini (Guy Pearce) has begun debunking mystics, psychics and others who claim to have paranormal powers. He offers $10,000 to anyone who can quote his mother's dying words to him.

Impoverished and uneducated Scottish con artist Mary McGarvie (Catherine Zeta-Jones) and her daughter, Benji (Saoirse Ronan), set their sights on Houdini's reward when he visits Edinburgh on tour. Mary has a music hall psychic act that pulls in the public: Benji surreptitiously gathers information on members of the audience, which Mary uses to fake contact with their deceased loved ones.

Mary and Benji charm Houdini, spending time with him out of the public eye. However, Benji starts feeling isolated as her mother and the magician begin a relationship. She also has distressing dreams about being trapped in an underwater tank, and an angel-like figure with red hair. While initially suspicious and hostile, Houdini's protective manager, Mr.  Sugarman (Timothy Spall), eventually tells Mary and Benji the truth: Houdini, busy doing a show, was unable to visit his mother on her deathbed, and is racked with guilt.

Mary, wearing Houdini's mother's wedding dress, performs the heavily-publicized act surrounded by a crowd of reporters. When she has a crisis of conscience and attempts to leave, Benji begins seizing on the ground. She utters the words of the Kaddish, addresses Houdini as "Ehrich" (his real given name), and asks (in a mix of German and German-accented English) where he is. Houdini says, "I'm here, Mama," and begins crying next to Benji. (Whether her fit is genuine or staged is not specified.) When a note written to confirm the veracity of the experiment is shown to be blank, Houdini reveals to the press the "eternal shame" he feels because he wasn't able to reach his mother before she died. Thus, he was unable to comfort her in her moment of death, and doesn't know her final words.

The McGarvies are awarded the $10,000. Mary becomes disgruntled, feeling Houdini does not love her as she believed. However, he visits the small cottage Mary and Benji share and confirms his feelings for her. They make love and spend the night together before Houdini leaves for a performance in Montreal.

Following Houdini's arrival in Canada, a "Red-Haired Prankster" abruptly punches him in the stomach, fatally rupturing his appendix. After calling for a doctor, Sugarman privately reveals that he told Mary and Benji the truth about Houdini's mother, hoping that the staged seance would provide him with closure; Houdini replies, "I know."

At a movie theater in Scotland, Benji weeps while viewing newsreel footage about Houdini's death, in which he faces the camera and appears to bid goodbye. In a voiceover, Benji states that, "Houdini changed our lives. And for a wee short while, we taught him how to love."

Cast 
 Guy Pearce as Harry Houdini  
 Catherine Zeta-Jones as Mary McGarvie   
 Timothy Spall as Sugarman
 Saoirse Ronan as Benji McGarvie  
 Malcolm Shields as Leith Romeo 
 Leni Harper as Leith Romeo's wife
 Ralph Riach as Mr. Robertson

Production 
The film was shot on location in London and Edinburgh, and at Pinewood Studios, Buckinghamshire, produced by Myriad Pictures and is being distributed by The Weinstein Company. Guy Pearce spent six weeks learning Houdini's tricks from magician Ross Skiffington. Magic consultant for the film was English magician Scott Penrose.

Box office 
Death Defying Acts earned $2,839,345 at the Spanish box office, $800,505 in South Korea, $713,741 in Australia and $608,455 in Mexico. Globally, the film took $6,415,141. It was on a very limited release in larger markets such as the United Kingdom, Canada and the United States, resulting in low box-office takings there.

Critical reception
The film received mixed reviews, with a 42% rating on Rotten Tomatoes based on 38 reviews, with an average score of 4.98/10.

Awards and nominations 
 The APRA-AGSC Screen Music Awards of 2009 were issued on 2 November, by Australasian Performing Right Association (APRA) and Australian Guild of Screen Composers (AGSC) at the City Recital Hall, Sydney.
 2009 APRA Best Soundtrack Album win for Death Defying Acts by Cezary Skubiszewski.

References

External links 
 
Death Defying Acts at Rotten Tomatoes
 

2007 films
2000s historical films
British historical films
BBC Film films
Films directed by Gillian Armstrong
Films set in 1926
Films about magic and magicians
Films shot in Edinburgh
Australian thriller films
Harry Houdini
Cultural depictions of Harry Houdini
Films scored by Cezary Skubiszewski
Films set in Edinburgh
2000s English-language films
2000s British films